The 2004–05 Illinois State Redbirds men's basketball team represented Illinois State University during the 2004–05 NCAA Division I men's basketball season. The Redbirds, led by second year head coach Porter Moser, played their home games at Redbird Arena and competed as a member of the Missouri Valley Conference.

They finished the season 17–13, 8–10 in conference play to finish in sixth place. They were the number six seed for the Missouri Valley Conference tournament. They were defeated by Creighton University in their quarterfinal game.

Roster

Schedule

|-
!colspan=9 style=|Regular Season

|-
!colspan=9 style=|State FarmMissouri Valley Conference {MVC} tournament

References

Illinois State Redbirds men's basketball seasons
Illinois State
Illinois State Redbirds men's
Illinois State Redbirds men's